This is a chronological list of films produced in Belgium. For an alphabetical list, see :Category:Belgian films

1909-1919

1920s

1930s

1940s

1950s

References

External links
 Belgian film at the Internet Movie Database

1900s
Films
Lists of 1900s films
Films
Lists of 1910s films
Films
Lists of 1920s films
Films
Lists of 1930s films
Films
Lists of 1940s films
Films
Lists of 1950s films